Lafif Lakhdar (also written "Al-Afif Al-Akhdar" or "Afif Lakhdar") was a French-Tunisian writer and journalist. He was born the 6th of February 1934 in Maktar and died the 26th of July 2013.

Life

Lafif Lakhdar was born into a very poor family. He studied in a madrasa and applied the University of Ez-Zitouna in Tunis ; he became a lawyer in 1957. He left Tunisia in 1961 and moved to Algeria, where he was one of Ahmed Ben Bella's close friends. He began a long journey throughout the Middle East. In 1979 he settled in France.

As a leftist thinker he took part to the debate on secularism in Muslim countries. As a journalist he worked for several newspapers : Al-Hayat, Al-Quds Al-Arabi and more recently for the online magazine Elaph.

Books
 The Position on Religion (in Arabic), Dar al-Tali'a, Beyrouth, 1972.
 L'organisation moderne, Dar Al-Tali'a, Beyrouth, 1972.
 Mohamed Abd El Motaleb Al Houni, L'impasse arabe. Les Arabes face à la nouvelle stratégie américaine, Preface by L. Lakhdar, Paris, L'Harmattan, 2004
  Min Muhammad al-iman ila Muhammad at-tarikh ("Muhammad: From Faith to History"), Al-Kamel Verlag, Cologne, 2014.

Selected articles
 "Moving From Salafi to Rationalist Education," in The Middle East Review of International Affairs (Volume 9, No. 1, Article 3, March 2005).

Bibliography
 Shaker Al-Nabulsi, The Devil's Advocate : A Study of Al-Afif Al-Akhdar's Thought, Beyrouth, Arab Institute for Research & Publishing, 2005

References

External links
 Articles in Arabic on "SSRCAW.org" dealing with the "Arab Spring" (2011) : http://www.ssrcaw.org/default.asp?cid=&serchtext=%C7%E1%DA%DD%ED%DD+%C7%E1%C3%CE%D6%D1
 "Is the Qu'ran an Encyclopædia of Science ?" (in English) : http://almuslih.org/index.php?option=com_content&view=article&id=167:is-the-qurn-an-encyclopaedia-of-science-1&catid=42:ethical-issues&Itemid=210
 "Why reform Islam?" (in English) : http://almuslih.org/index.php?option=com_content&view=article&id=153:why-reform-islam&catid=38:obstacles-to-reform&Itemid=207
 Articles on MEMRI (in English) : https://web.archive.org/web/20110104065457/http://www.memri.org/subject/en/137.htm
 Article published in Haaretz ("An Arab Spinoza"), Herald Tribune (17 March 2006) : https://web.archive.org/web/20110112073554/http://artsci.wustl.edu/~marton/JihadRoots.html
 Selected articles in Arabic : https://archive.today/20041129023408/http://www.yassar.freesurf.fr/authors/lakhdar.html

1934 births
2013 deaths
Tunisian writers
Tunisian emigrants to France
French male writers